is a subway station on the Toei Asakusa Line, operated by the Tokyo Metropolitan Bureau of Transportation. It is located in Ōta, Tokyo, Japan. Its number is A-02.

Station layout
Magome Station has an island platform serving two tracks. Platform 1 is for passengers bound for Nishi-Magome Station. Platform 2 is for those traveling in the opposite direction toward Sengakuji and Oshiage Stations.

History
Magome opened on November 15, 1968 as a station on Toei Line 1. In 1978, the line took its present name.

Surrounding area
The station serves the Kita Magome neighborhood. Nearby are a public library, and a Ricoh facility.

Railway stations in Japan opened in 1968
Railway stations in Tokyo
Toei Asakusa Line